Films produced in Norway in the 1930s:

1930s

External links
 Norwegian film at the Internet Movie Database

1930s
Lists of 1930s films
Films